is a passenger railway station in the city of Kimitsu, Chiba Prefecture, Japan, operated by the East Japan Railway Company (JR East).

Lines
Tawarada Station is a station on the Kururi Line, and is located 21.0 km from the terminus of the line at Kisarazu Station.

Station layout
The station consists of a single side platform serving bidirectional traffic. The platform is short, and can only handle trains with a length of three carriages or less. The station is unattended.

Platform

History
Tawarada Station was opened on July 10, 1921 as a station on the Chiba Prefectural Railways Kururi Line. The line was nationalized into the Japanese Government Railways (JGR) on September 1, 1923. The JGR became the Japan National Railways (JNR) after World War II. The station was absorbed into the JR East network upon the privatization of the JNR on April 1, 1987. The original station building was destroyed in a fire on January 3, 2008, and  a new structure was completed in 2009.

Passenger statistics
In fiscal 2006, the station was used by an average of 64 passengers daily.

Surrounding area
 
 Obitsu River

See also
 List of railway stations in Japan

References

External links

 JR East Station information  

Kururi Line
Stations of East Japan Railway Company
Railway stations in Chiba Prefecture
Railway stations in Japan opened in 1921
Kimitsu